Albert-Félix de Lapparent (1905–1975) was a French palaeontologist. He was also a Sulpician priest. He undertook a number of fossil-hunting explorations in the Sahara desert. He contributed greatly to our knowledge of dinosaurs and other prehistoric creatures. In 1986, José Bonaparte named the dinosaur Lapparentosaurus in his honour.

Dinosaurs named by Lapparent were Inosaurus tedreftensis (Lapparent, 1960) and Lusitanosaurus liassicus (Lapparent and Zbyszewski, 1957).

New species of known genera are also credited to him. In alphabetical order, they are: Apatosaurus alenquerensis (Lapparent and Zbyszewski, 1957), Astrodon pusillus (Lapparent and Zbyszewski, 1957), Brachiosaurus atalaiensis  (Lapparent and Zbyszewski, 1957), Brachiosaurus nougaredi (Lapparent, 1960),  Cetiosaurus mogrebiensis (Lapparent, 1955), Elaphrosaurus gautieri (Lapparent, 1960), Elaphrosaurus iguidiensis (Lapparent, 1960), Megalosaurus pombali (Lapparent and Zbyszewski, 1957) and Rebbachisaurus tamesnensis (Lapparent, 1960).

The giant crocodile Sarcosuchus was also discovered by him, in 1964.

References
Enchanted Learning website
A. F. d.e. Lapparent and G. Zbyszewski. 1957. Les dinosauriens du Portugal [The dinosaurs of Portugal]. Mémoires des Services Géologiques du Portugal, nouvelle série 2:1-63
A. F. de. Lapparent, 1960. Les Dinosauriens du "Continental intercalaire" du Saharal central [The dinosaurs of the "Continental Intercalaire" of the central Sahara]. Mémoires de la Société géologique de France, nouvelle série 39(88A):1-57

1905 births
1975 deaths
French paleontologists